Archives New Zealand (Māori: Te Rua Mahara o te Kāwanatanga) is New Zealand's national archive and the official guardian of its public archives. As the government's recordkeeping authority, it administers the Public Records Act 2005 and promotes good information management throughout government.

History

Establishment
In 1954, the First National Government's cabinet approved the establishment of a national archive and the office of a chief archivist, and the drafting of enabling legislation. The Archives Act 1957 established the National Archives within the Department of Internal Affairs (DIA). It also gave the chief archivist the power to approve the disposal of official records and to require the transfer of records to the National Archives after 25 years. The Archives Act also affirmed public access to the National Archives. While the National Archives were established in 1957, they were preceded by the Dominion Archives and the former war archives at the Hope Gibbons building in Wellington.

Expansion and legislative entrenchment
In 1977, an amendment to the Local Government Act 1974 extended limited protection to local government archives. For the first twenty years, the National Archives had to contend with inadequate storage and staffing. Following Wilfred I. Smith's report, the Government took steps to address those issues, the headquarters moving into the 1966 4-storey building of the former Government Printing Office on Thorndon Quay in 1990. The National Archives' legal position was further entrenched by the passage of legislation such as the Ombudsmen Act 1975, the Official Information Act 1982, and the State Sector Act 1988.

In 2000, the National Archives was separated from the Department of Internal Affairs and renamed as Archives New Zealand.

In 2005, the Fifth Labour Government passed the Public Records Act 2005 to deal with digital archives and the creation of state-owned enterprises. The Act also greatly expanded the role of Archives New Zealand and the powers of the Chief Archivist, and established the Archives Council to advise the Minister responsible for Archives New Zealand. The organisation now has a leadership role for recordkeeping throughout central and local government.

Reintegration under Internal Affairs, 2011–present
In 2011, Archives New Zealand and the National Library of New Zealand were merged back into the Department of Internal Affairs. Before 1 February 2011 Archives New Zealand was a separate government department.

In 2018, the Christchurch office moved to a new location in Wigram near the Air Force Museum of New Zealand.

The New Zealand Archivist Vol 3 No 1 pages 5–10 includes a more comprehensive history of archives in New Zealand.

In December 2020, the DIA confirmed that Archives NZ along with the National Library and Ngā Taonga Sound & Vision would move to a proposed purpose-built business park called the Horowhenua Business Park in Levin at an unspecified future date.

Facilities
The national office for Archives New Zealand is in Wellington. It also has offices in Auckland, Christchurch, and Dunedin.

List of Chief Archivists 
Sources
 Secretary of Internal Affairs exercised Chief Archivist powers (1957–1962)
 Michael Standish (1962)
John Pascoe (1963–1972)
Judith S. Hornabrook (1972–1982)
 Ray F. Grover (1981–1991)
 Kathryn Patterson (1991–1998)
 Chris Hurley (Acting) (1998–2000)
 Lyn Provost (Acting) (2000–2001)
Dianne Macaskill (2001–2009)
 Greg Goulding (Acting) (2009–2011)
 Greg Goulding (2011–2014)
 Marilyn Little (2014–2017)
 Richard Foy (Acting) (2017–2018)
 Richard Foy (2018–2020)
Stephen Clarke (2020–2022)
 Anahera Morehu (2022-present)

The position of Director of National Archives and Chief Archivist were held simultaneously since late 1982.

Organisation 
Archives New Zealand has four units:

 Regional & Access Services;
 Archives Management;
 Government Recordkeeping; and
 Māori & Community Archives.

Functions 
Archives New Zealand:

 manages the Public Records Act 2005 and works with government agencies to administer the Act;
 makes sure records of government decision making are created and those of long-term value, including digital, are transferred into its care;
 provides recordkeeping advice and information to government agencies;
 makes public archives accessible to government departments, other organisations and the public;
 manages the public archives in a protected and secure environment; and
 provides leadership and support for archival activities across New Zealand.

Archives Council Te Rua Wānanga 
The Archives Council Te Rua Wānanga is an unincorporated body established under the Public Records Act 2005. It provides independent advice to the Minister responsible for Archives New Zealand on recordkeeping and archives matters, including those for which tikanga Māori is relevant.

The Archives Council meets four times a year to discuss archival and record keeping matters. The Council reports directly to the Minister on its functions during the preceding year. The Minister, as soon as practicable, presents the report to the House of Representatives.

The Archives Council's reports to the Minister are available on Archives New Zealand's website.

Holdings

Archives New Zealand holds more than 7 million New Zealand government records dating from the early 19th to the early 21st century. Records held include the originals of the Treaty of Waitangi, government documents, maps, paintings, photographs and film.

Significant holdings include:

 the archives of the New Zealand Company;
 the New Zealand Parliament's archives;
 commissions of inquiry documents;
 most higher court records;
 archives of government agencies;
 New Zealand Defence Force archives.

Finding records held 
Researchers can search descriptions of the records using Archway, an online database of records held at Archives New Zealand.

Physical records access 
Access to holdings is available through four reading rooms in Auckland, Wellington, Christchurch and Dunedin, and through a remote reference service. 110,205 linear metres of physical archives were held in storage as at June 2018.

Digitised records 
Digitised records are available through Archway. Digital records are also available via DigitalNZ. A selection of records are also available on Archives New Zealand's social media channels, including YouTube and Flickr.

Examples of digitised records available:

 New Zealand Defence Force (NZDF) Personnel Files from the First World War – over 141,000 service files digitised.
 New Zealand Official War Art Collection.
 DigitalNZ filter for Archives New Zealand's records.

For a details of what is digitised by topic see Archives New Zealand's website.

Exhibitions

He Tohu exhibition

In May 2017, a new permanent archive exhibition He Tohu, opened at the National Library of New Zealand building on Molesworth Street, Wellington.

He Tohu is an exhibition of three of New Zealand's most significant constitutional documents:

 1835 He Whakaputanga o te Rangatiratanga o Nu Tireni – the Declaration of Independence of the Chiefs of New Zealand (the Declaration);
 1840 Te Tiriti o Waitangi – the Treaty of Waitangi; and
 1893 Women's Suffrage Petition – Te Petihana Whakamana Pōti Wahine.

The development of the exhibition began in 2014. It provides an award-winning document room containing the latest exhibition technology and a surrounding interactive space for visitors to learn about the documents and the people who signed them. He Tohu is accompanied by an education and outreach programme including an online component to make it accessible for those not Wellington-based. He Tohu is presented by Archives New Zealand and the National Library of New Zealand, both of which are part of the Department of Internal Affairs. The documents remain in the care of the Chief Archivist under the Public Records Act 2005.

See also 
 List of national archives
 National Library of New Zealand

References

External links
Archives New Zealand official website
Archway (online database of records held at Archives New Zealand)
Audio Visual Archives (collection of around 21,000 reels of film and 1000 videotapes)
War Art (diverse collection of about 1,500 artworks covering major conflicts involving New Zealanders from World War One onwards)
Archives New Zealand on Flickr
Archives New Zealand on YouTube

New Zealand Public Service departments
Archives in New Zealand
New Zealand